Andrey Alshanik (born 3 May 1999) is a Belarusian professional footballer who plays for Slavia Mozyr.

References

External links 
 
 

1999 births
Living people
Belarusian footballers
Association football midfielders
FC BATE Borisov players
FC Naftan Novopolotsk players
FC Energetik-BGU Minsk players
FC Krumkachy Minsk players
FC Slavia Mozyr players